Gholam Reza Pahlavi (15 May 1923 – 7 May 2017) was an Iranian prince and a member of the Pahlavi dynasty, as the son of Reza Shah and half-brother of Mohammad Reza Pahlavi, the last Shah of Iran.

Following the death of his half-sister Ashraf Pahlavi on 7 January 2016, Gholam Reza became the only living child of Reza Pahlavi. He resided in Paris with his family. He died on 7 May 2017 at the age of 93, eight days before his 94th birthday.

Early life and education
Pahlavi was born on 15 May 1923 in Iran. He was the fifth child and third son of Reza Shah, the founder of the Iranian Pahlavi dynasty. His mother, Turan (Qamar ol-Molouk) Amirsoleimani, was related to the Qajar dynasty deposed in 1925 in favor of Reza Shah. More specifically, she was the daughter of a Qajar dignitary, Issa Majd Al Saltaneh. She was also the granddaughter of Majd ed-Dowleh Qajar-Qovanlu Amirsoleimani, Naser al Din Shah's maternal cousin. Gholam Reza's parents were married in 1922 and divorced shortly after his birth in 1923.

He received primary education in Iran and then went to Switzerland for secondary education at Institut Le Rosey. In 1936, he returned to the country and attended military school. He accompanied his father, Reza Shah, to his exile in British Mauritius when the latter was forced to abdicate in September 1941. In the aftermath of Reza Shah's abdication, the British and Russian envoys attempted to put Gholam Reza on the throne, bypassing Crown Prince Mohammad Reza Pahlavi when their efforts to end the Pahlavi dynasty and reinstate the Qajar dynasty failed. It, however, also did not work. Gholam Reza graduated from Princeton University. In August 1952 while serving in the army Pahlavi joined a fourteen–week military training in Fort Knox, Kentucky.

Career and activities
Upon returning to Iran, he attended military officers' training college for a military career. Pahlavi began his career in Iran's armed forces serving as a first lieutenant. Then he served as inspector general in the army. After holding different positions in the army he was promoted to the rank of lieutenant general in 1973. He retired from the Iranian army as a brigadier general.

In 1955, he became a member of the International Olympic Committee. He also served as president of the Iranian National Olympic Committee. He was a member of the Royal Council which ruled Iran during the international visits of Mohammad Reza Pahlavi.

In early December 1973, he and his wife officially visited China just before the first Iranian ambassador, Abbas Aram, began to serve in that country. As president of the Iranian national Olympic committee, he supported China's objection to Taiwan's participation in the 1976 Montreal Olympic Games. However, he never tended to play an active role in domestic politics.

During the reign of Mohammad Reza Pahlavi, he owned land in Iran and was a large shareholder in six firms. Gholam Reza Pahlavi was a member of the construction society together with Ashraf Pahlavi and Teymur Bakhtiar. It was established by the Shah to get contracts for municipal and road construction projects, and the members were given certain amounts from the profits. Gholam Reza Pahlavi involved in a corruption case when he took payment from an East European country which made an investment contract with Iran. Following the warning of Iranian economy minister, Alinaghi Alikhani, the Shah ordered him to return the payment.

Personal life and later years

Pahlavi married Homa Aalam on 4 April 1947 in Tehran. They had a daughter, Mehrnaz (born 4 February 1949), and a son, Bahman (born 30 January 1950). They divorced in 1956, and he married Manijeh Jahanbani, a Qajar princess, in Tehran on 6 March 1962. This marriage produced two daughters and a son: Azardokht (Khadijeh) Pahlavi, Maryam (Zahra) Pahlavi and Bahram Pahlavi.

Pahlavi left Iran before the 1979 revolution along with other relatives. He settled in Paris. In the immediate aftermath of the revolution, Ayatollah Sadegh Khalkhali, a religious judge and then chairman of the Revolutionary Court, informed the press that a death sentence was passed on the members of the Pahlavi family, including Gholam Reza and other former Shah officials. He died at the age of 93 at the American Hospital of Paris on 7 May 2017.

Book
Pahlavi published a book, Mon père, mon frère, les Shahs d'Iran (French: My father, my brother, the Shahs of Iran), in 2005, dealing with both his experiences and thoughts about the future of Iran. The book was published in French and Persian.

Honours

National honours
 Knight Grand Cross of the Order of Pahlavi
 Order of Glory
 Order of Military Merit, 2nd class
 Order of Service, 2nd class
 Order of Rashtakhiz, 1st class
 National Uprising Medal [28th Amordad 1332 Medal] (1953)
 Imperial Coronation Medal (26 October 1967)

Foreign honours
  Order of the Supreme Sun, 1st Class (Kingdom of Afghanistan)
  Knight Grand Cross of Royal Order of Isabella the Catholic (Kingdom of Spain, 1978)
  King Birendra Coronation Medal (Kingdom of Nepal, 24 February 1975)

References

External links
 Gholam Reza Pahlavi's official website

1923 births
2017 deaths
Imperial Iranian Army brigadier generals
Exiles of the Iranian Revolution in France
Imperial Iranian Army major generals
International Olympic Committee members
Iranian emigrants to France
Iranian royalty
Knights Grand Cross of the Order of Isabella the Catholic
Mazandarani people
People exiled to Mauritius
Gholam Reza
Princeton University alumni
Sons of kings
Alumni of Institut Le Rosey